Aqqala County is in Golestan province, Iran. The capital of the county is the city of Aqqala. At the 2006 census, the county's population was 109,440 in 22,804 households. The following census in 2011 counted 124,185 people in 31,817 households. At the 2016 census, the county's population was 132,733 in 35,989 households.

Administrative divisions

The population history of Aqqala County's administrative divisions over three consecutive censuses is shown in the following table. The latest census shows two districts, five rural districts, and two cities.

References

 

Counties of Golestan Province